Darnell Theophilous Fisher (born 4 April 1994) is an English professional footballer who  plays as a right-back for Championship club Middlesbrough. He has previously played in the Scottish Premiership for Celtic and St Johnstone, as well as in the Championship with Rotherham United and Preston North End.

Career

Celtic
Born in Reading, Berkshire, Fisher began his career at hometown club Eldon Celtic, before moving on to Farnborough. He then signed his first professional contract in the summer of 2011 when he joined Celtic. Fisher made his first team debut for Celtic on 19 October 2013 against Hibernian at Easter Road. Fisher got this opportunity to play at right-back for the first team due to Adam Matthews and Mikael Lustig both being injured. The young defender got an extended run in the team and made a further 12 appearances. An injury sustained in March 2014 ruled Fisher for the rest of the season, but Celtic went on to win the league title and he made enough appearances to collect a league winner's medal.

Fisher returned to playing football for the Development Side in September 2014.  He made his first appearance of the season for the first team on 11 December 2014 when he came on as a substitute for the under-performing Matthews in Celtic's 4–3 defeat away against Dinamo Zagreb in the Europa League. Fisher made a further four substitute appearances in League and League Cup games from January to March 2015. He was an unused substitute in Celtic's 2–0 win over Dundee United on 15 March 2015 in the 2015 Scottish League Cup Final, entitling him to a winner's medal. On 25 August 2015, Fisher was loaned to St Johnstone for the rest of the 2015–16 season. He scored his first professional goal in a 3–0 win over Hearts on 19 March 2016.

Rotherham United
Fisher signed a three-year contract with Rotherham United in August 2016.

Preston North End
Following Rotherham's relegation at the end of his first season, Fisher signed a three-year contract with Preston North End for an undisclosed fee, later revealed as being "nothing" by the Preston manager Alex Neil.

Fisher was investigated and subsequently charged with violent conduct by the Football Association (FA) in November 2020 after footage showed him twice grab Sheffield Wednesday's Callum Paterson by the genitals during a game between their respective clubs on 21 November. On 27 November, Fisher was found guilty and banned for three games.

Middlesbrough
On 29 January 2021, Fisher joined Championship side Middlesbrough for an undisclosed fee (thought to be around £300,000), signing a two-and-a-half-year contract.

Career statistics

Honours
Celtic
 Scottish Premiership: 2013–14
 Scottish League Cup: 2015

References

1994 births
Living people
Sportspeople from Reading, Berkshire
English footballers
Association football defenders
Black British sportsmen
Celtic F.C. players
St Johnstone F.C. players
Rotherham United F.C. players
Preston North End F.C. players
Middlesbrough F.C. players
Scottish Professional Football League players
English Football League players
Footballers from Berkshire
English people of Grenadian descent